Amanda Overland (born August 30, 1981) is a Canadian short track speed skater who competed in the 2006 Winter Olympics. She is the sister of Kevin Overland and Cindy Overland, both Olympic Speed Skaters.

External links 
CBC.ca biography

1981 births
Living people
Canadian female short track speed skaters
Medalists at the 2006 Winter Olympics
Olympic short track speed skaters of Canada
Olympic silver medalists for Canada
Olympic medalists in short track speed skating
Short track speed skaters at the 2006 Winter Olympics
Sportspeople from Kitchener, Ontario
21st-century Canadian women